UK Finance is a trade association for the UK banking and financial services sector, formed on 1 July 2017. It represents over 300 firms in the UK providing credit, banking, markets and payment-related services. The association formulates policy for its members, advocates those policies with HM Government, regulators and the media, and supports industry collaboration in the interests of efficiency and better customer outcomes. Its founder Chairman was and remains Bob Wigley.

It was the result of a merger of the British Bankers' Association, Payments UK, the Council of Mortgage Lenders, the UK Cards Association and the Asset Based Finance Association.

External links
 

Bankers associations
Banking in the United Kingdom
Business organisations based in the United Kingdom
Trade associations based in the United Kingdom
Organizations established in 2017
Payment systems organizations
Financial services in the United Kingdom